Mark Mariscal (born September 10, 1979) is a former American college and professional football placekicker and punter who played in the Canadian Football League (CFL) for a single season in 2004.  He played college football for the University of Colorado, earned consensus All-American honors, and was recognized as the top punter in college football.  He played professionally for the CFL's Montreal Alouettes.

Mariscal attended the University of Colorado, where he played for the Colorado Buffaloes football team from 2000 to 2003.  As a junior in 2002, he set an NCAA Division I record for most punts of fifty yards or greater (29), was a first-team All-Big 12 selection, and was recognized as a consensus first-team All-American (2002).  He was also the 2002 recipient of the Ray Guy Award as the nation's best college punter.

Mariscal signed with the New Orleans Saints of the National Football League (NFL) as an undrafted free agent in 2003, and was later a member of the NFL preseason or practice squads of the New York Jets, Denver Broncos and Philadelphia Eagles.  In , he appeared in six regular season CFL games for the Montreal Alouettes, acting as both the Alouettes' punter and placekicker.

References

External links
 Article at Scout.com
 Career Statistics & Transactions

1979 births
Living people
All-American college football players
American football punters
Colorado Buffaloes football players
Denver Broncos players
Montreal Alouettes players
New Orleans Saints players
Philadelphia Eagles players